Invasive species in California, the introduced species of fauna−animals and flora−plants that are established and have naturalized within California.

Native plants and animals can become threatened endangered species from the spread of invasive species in  natural habitats and/or developed areas (e.g. agriculture, transport, settlement).

Animals
Invasive animal species include:

Mammals
Black rat
Coypu (also known as nutria)
Fallow deer
Axis deer (eradicated)
Feral cat
Feral dog
Wild boar

Birds
Common starling
Red-masked parakeet
Mute swan
Rock dove
House sparrow
Eurasian collared dove
Japanese white-eye
Lilac-crowned parrot
Yellow-headed parrot

Reptiles
Southern watersnake
Northern watersnake
Red-eared slider
Brown anole
Jackson's chameleon
Italian wall lizard
Mediterranean house gecko
Spiny softshell turtle

Amphibians
American bullfrog
African clawed frog

Fish
Snakehead (eradicated)

Invertebrates
Apis mellifera scutellata — Africanized honeybee
Bactrocera dorsalis — Oriental fruit fly (eradicated)
Carcinus maenas — European green crab
Corbicula fluminea — Asian clam, golden freshwater clam
Eriocheir sinensis — Chinese mitten crab
Euwallacea fornicatus — Polyphagous and Kuroshio shot hole borers
Linepithema humile — Argentine ant
Liriomyza trifolii — American serpentine leaf miner
Milax gagates — greenhouse slug
Potamopyrgus antipodarum — New Zealand mud snail
Pomacea canaliculata — channeled apple snail
Solenopsis invicta — red imported fire ant
Theba pisana — white garden snail

Plants

Invasive plant species include:
Aegilops triuncialis — barbed goat grass
Acacia melanoxylon — black acacia
Ailanthus altissima — tree-of-Vanessa
Arundo donax — giant reed
Carpobrotus edulis — iceplant
Centaurea solstitialis — yellow starthistle
Cirsium vulgare — bull thistle
Cortaderia jubata — pampas grass
Eucalyptus camaldulensis — red gum
Eucalyptus globulus — blue gum
Ficus carica — edible fig
Fraxinus uhdei — shamel ash, evergreen ash
Hedera canariensis — Algerian ivy, 'California' ivy
Ipomoea indica — blue morning glory
Ligustrum ovalifolium — 'California' privet
Marrubium vulgare — horehound
Mesembryanthemum crystallinum — common iceplant
Nicotiana glauca — tree tobacco
Pennisetum setaceum — fountain grass
Ricinus communis — castor bean
Rubus armeniacus — Himalayan blackberry
Schinus terebinthifolius — Brazilian pepper tree
Tamarix ramosissima — salt cedar, tamarisk
Ulex europaeus — common gorse
Vachellia tortilis — umbrella thorn
Vinca major— periwinkle
Washingtonia robusta — Mexican fan palm
Zantedeschia aethiopica — calla lily
  Genista monspessulana -  French broom
  Spartium junceum -  Spanish broom

See also
List of native plants in California
List of invasive plant species in California
List of invasive species

References

External links
University of California Statewide IPM Program: Exotic & invasive pests website homepage — IPM = integrated pest management.

Invasive species
Invasive species
California
California
L
L